Benzoguanamine is an organic compound with the chemical formula (CNH2)2(CC6H5)N3. It is related to melamine but with one amino group replaced by phenyl. Benzoguanamine is used in the manufacturing of melamine resins. Unlike melamine ((CNH2)3N3), benzoguanamine is not a crosslinker. The "benzo" prefix is historical, as the compound contains phenyl, not a benzo group. A related compound is acetoguanamine.

The compound is prepared by condensation of cyanoguanidine with benzonitrile.

Safety
LD50 (oral, rats) is 1470 mg/kg.

References 

Triazines